Phongsali or Phongsaly is the capital of Phongsaly Province, Laos. It is the northernmost provincial capital in Laos, opposite Attapeu in the south. The town has about 8,000 inhabitants. It lies at approximately 1,430 meters elevation on the slopes of Mount Phu Fa (1,625 meters). Phongsali has summer temperatures around 25-30 °C, with frequent rain. In winter, from November to March, it is cool and mostly sunny, with daytime temperatures between 10-18 °C.

In the centre of the town are houses built in Yunnanese style with ornate wooden fronts. This is quite rare as the preserved city was not destroyed like other cities in northern Laos during the Vietnam War by bombing.

A 400 year-old tea plantation is about 18 kilometers away in the village of Ban Komaen, which according to some tea experts has some of the oldest tea trees in the world. The large root system of the old trees extends deep into the mineral-rich soil and gives the "Phongsali tea" a distinctive aroma and taste.

Languages

Climate
Phongsali has a subtropical highland climate (Köppen climate classification: Cwb).

References

<ref>http://www.citypopulation.de/en/laos/cities/<ref>

Further reading
 Kingsadā, Thō̜ngphet, and Tadahiko Shintani. 1999 Basic Vocabularies of the Languages Spoken in Phongxaly, Lao P.D.R. Tokyo: Institute for the Study of Languages and Cultures of Asia and Africa (ILCAA).
 Shintani, Tadahiko, Ryuichi Kosaka, and Takashi Kato. 2001. Linguistic Survey of Phongxaly, Lao P.D.R. Tokyo: Institute for the Study of Languages and Cultures of Asia and Africa (ILCAA).
 Kato, Takashi. 2008. Linguistic Survey of Tibeto-Burman languages in Lao P.D.R. Tokyo: Institute for the Study of Languages and Cultures of Asia and Africa (ILCAA).

Populated places in Phongsaly Province